Testify is a compilation album released only in North America by the British house music band M People. It contains the three new tracks that the band recorded for their British compilation album, The Best of M People, the previous year, and the artwork is taken from the photographs used for that album. However, it contains two album tracks from Fresco and three remixes that originally appeared on The Best of M People'''s accompanying promotional remix collection in place of the originals.

In addition, four songs are replaced by different edits. It is notable for being the only place that the original versions of "Testify", "What a Fool Believes", the single mix of "Search for the Hero", and the single edits of "Angel St" and "Just for You" are available on vinyl, as its British equivalent was released on CD and cassette only. The version of "What a Fool Believes" is exclusive to this release, since an edit appears on The Best of M People''.

Track listing
All songs written by Mike Pickering, Paul Heard and Heather Small except where noted.

Release history

References

M People compilation albums
1999 compilation albums